The Changhe Ideal is a city car produced by Jiangxi Changhe Suzuki Automobile Company, in a joint-venture between Chinese and Japanese automakers Changhe and Suzuki, since 2003. The model is known in Brazil as the Effa M100, in Uruguay as the Effa Ideal and in Italy as Martin Motors Ideal 1000.

Overview
The Ideal was designed by Bertone, available initially with a 1.1-litre gasoline engine and safety items such as anti-lock braking system and airbags. It was facelifted in 2006, when it received new lights, a new grille and an updated interior.

The Ideal was sold in Colombia as taxi mainly in 2009 and 2010, but due to the lack of quality most vehicles are out of service today.

NICE Ze-O

NICE Car Company presented an electric version of the Ideal called the NICE Ze-O at the 2008 British International Motor Show, but a production version was not forthcoming. NICE shortly after went into administration and was acquired by Aixam-Mega.

Gallery

References

External links 
Specifications of the Ideal I
Specifications of the Ideal II
The Ideal II in Mexico

City cars
Ideal
Cars introduced in 2003
2010s cars